This is a partial list of battles on the land or water of Korea.

Three Kingdoms

Goguryeo

Goguryeo–Wa War
Battle of Jwawon
Goguryeo–Wei War
Battle of Biryusu
Battle of Linyuguan
Battle of Salsu
Siege of Liaodong (612)
Siege of Liaodong (645)
Siege of Ansi
Battle of Sasu
Siege of Pyeongyang (668)

Baekje
Battle of Chiyang
Battle of Baekgang, a battle between Baekje and Japanese forces and the Tang–Silla alliance.

Silla
Battle of Gwansan
Battle of Hwangsanbeol

North–South States

Unified Silla

Battle of Maeso

Balhae
Battle of Cheonmun-ryeong

Goryeo

Khitan invasions of Korea

Battle of Guju

Korean–Jurchen border conflicts
Korean–Jurchen border conflicts

Mongol invasions of Korea

Battle of Cheoin
Battle of Chungju (1253)
Siege of Kuju

Mongol invasions of Japan
Battle of Bun'ei
Battle of Kōan

Joseon

Early period
Gihae Eastern Expedition
Disturbance of the Three Ports
Korean–Jurchen border conflicts

During the Imjin War

Battle of Busan (1592), a naval battle of the Seven Year War.
Battle of Okpo, naval battle of 1592.
Battle of Sacheon (1592), a naval battle of the Seven Year War.
Battle of Hansan Island in 1592, a key naval battle of the Seven Year War.
Siege of Jinju (1592)
Battle of Haengju
Battle of Chilcheollyang, a naval battle of the Seven Year War in 1597.
Battle of Myeongnyang, a naval battle of 1597 in the Seven Year War.
Battle of Noryang, a naval battle of 1598.
Battle of Sangju - a Japanese advancement,
Battle of Chungju - Japanese decisive victory
Siege of Busan - Japanese take Busan

Late period
Battle of Sarhū, a series of Manchu–Ming battles in 1619.
Siege of Namhan
Sino-Russian border conflicts
Battle of Ganghwa (1866)
General Sherman incident
Bombardment of the Selee River Forts
Battle of Ganghwa (1871)
Battle of Ganghwa (1875)

Armed Independent Wars
Battle of Fengwudong (Battle of Bong-o-dong)
Battle of Qingshanli (Battle of Cheongsanri)

Soviet-Japanese War in the Asia-Pacific theatre of World War II
Seishin Operation

Korean War

First Battle of Seoul
Battle of Osan, one of the first Korean War engagements, in 1950
Battle of Inchon, a decisive battle of the Korean War in 1950
Battle of the Imjin River, a 1951 battle of the Korean War
Battle of Bloody Ridge
Battle of Chosin Reservoir
Battle of Old Baldy
Battle of Heartbreak Ridge
Battle of Hill Eerie
Battle of the Hook
Battle of Kapyong, a 1951 battle of the Korean War
Second Battle of Seoul
Third Battle of Seoul
Operation Ripper
Operation Commando
Operation Courageous
Operation Tomahawk
Outpost Harry
Battle of Pakchon
Battle of White Horse

Engagements of the Republic of Korea (South Korea)
Korean War
Vietnam War
Battle of Đức Cơ
Tet Offensive
Battle of Trà Bình
Operation Masher/White Wing
Persian Gulf War
First Battle of Yeonpyeong
Second Battle of Yeonpyeong
Battle of Daecheong
Bombardment of Yeonpyeong
Operation Dawn of Gulf of Aden

Engagements of the Democratic People's Republic of Korea (North Korea)
Korean War
Vietnam War
Operation Rolling Thunder
Battle of Amami-Ōshima
First Battle of Yeonpyeong
Second Battle of Yeonpyeong
Battle of Daecheong
Bombardment of Yeonpyeong

See also
Military history of Korea
Military of South Korea
Lists of battles

Korea
 
Battles